Comte Pierre Antoine Anselme Jean Laurent Malet (14 August 1773 – 9 August 1815) was a maréchal de camp, and général de brigade.  He commanded the 3e régiment de chasseurs à pied (Middle Guard) at Waterloo; mortally wounded in this battle by a bullet in the left shoulder, he died of his wounds in the field-hospital at Charleroi.

Notes

References

1778 births
1815 deaths
Counts of the First French Empire
French military personnel killed in the Napoleonic Wars
Generals of the First French Empire